Mijakovići may refer to:
 Mijakovići, Vareš, a settlement in Vareš, Bosnia and Herzegovina
 Mijakovići, Pljevlja, Montenegro